San Miguel Totolapan is a city and seat of the municipality of San Miguel Totolapan, in the state of Guerrero, south-western Mexico. 

The Cuitlatec language, now extinct, used to be spoken in San Miguel Totolapan. Juana Can, the last speaker of Cuitlatec, is believed to have died in San Miguel Totolapan in the 1960s.

On 5 October 2022 members of the Los Tequileros criminal gang opened fire on the town hall, killing eighteen people, including the mayor Conrado Mendoza Almeda and his father.

References

Populated places in Guerrero